Aron Pollitz (11 February 1896 – 13 November 1977) was a Swiss football (soccer) player who competed in the 1924 Summer Olympics.

Career
After playing for BSC Old Boys from 1915 to 1924, Pollitz went to France to play for US Suisse Paris. On 13 March 1927, Pollitz accidentally kicked the  goalkeeper Georges Le Bidois, aged 26, at his carotid, the incident led to the goalkeeper's sudden death. Consequently, Pollitz left France back to his former club where he played for one year before retirement.

Pollitz had 23 caps with Switzerland from 1920 to 1925. He won the silver medal in Football at the 1924 Summer Olympics in Paris, in which he took part in all games of his team during the tournament.

References

External links
profile

1896 births
1977 deaths
Swiss men's footballers
Footballers at the 1924 Summer Olympics
Olympic footballers of Switzerland
Olympic silver medalists for Switzerland
Switzerland international footballers
Olympic medalists in football
Medalists at the 1924 Summer Olympics
BSC Young Boys players
Association football defenders
Footballers from Basel